Dmitri Pavlovich Parsky ( in Tula – 20 December 1921) was a Russian general of the Imperial Russian Army during World War I, who fought on the Eastern Front.
 
In 1893 he attended the General Staff Academy.

In World War I, he commanded the 12th Army from 20 July to 9 September 1917 and the 3rd Army from 9 September 1917 to 8 November 1917.

He was the first battle-experienced Tsarist General to offer his services to the Red Army, explaining his viewpoint thus
"I am far from this Bolshevism you preach. But I am ready to work honourably not only with them, but with anyone, even the Devil and his disciples, if only to save Russia from German slavery."

During the Russian Civil War, he first was commander of the Narva Front and later of the entire Northern Front.

He died of typhus in 1921.

Honours and awards
Order of St. Stanislaus, 3rd class (1896);
Order of St. Anne 3rd class (1900);
Order of St. Stanislaus, 2nd class (1903);
Order of St. Anne, 2nd class with swords (1906);
Order of St. Vladimir, 4th class with swords and bow (1906);
Order of St. Vladimir, 3rd class (1909, 31 January 1910);
Order of St. Stanislaus, 1st class (6 December 1913)
Order of St. George, 4th class (2 June 1915)
Gold Sword for Bravery (1916)

References

1866 births
1921 deaths
People from Tula, Russia
People from Tulsky Uyezd
Russian nobility
Imperial Russian lieutenant generals
Russian military personnel of World War I
Soviet military personnel of the Russian Civil War
Recipients of the Order of St. George of the Fourth Degree
Recipients of the Order of St. Vladimir, 2nd class
Recipients of the Order of St. Vladimir, 3rd class
Recipients of the Order of St. Vladimir, 4th class
Recipients of the Order of St. Anna, 1st class
Recipients of the Order of St. Anna, 2nd class
Recipients of the Order of St. Anna, 3rd class
Recipients of the Order of Saint Stanislaus (Russian), 1st class
Recipients of the Order of Saint Stanislaus (Russian), 2nd class
Recipients of the Order of Saint Stanislaus (Russian), 3rd class
Recipients of the Gold Sword for Bravery